Marek Avamere (born 26 January 1970) is an Estonian rower. He competed in the men's coxless four event at the 1992 Summer Olympics.

References

External links
 

1970 births
Living people
Estonian male rowers
Olympic rowers of Estonia
Rowers at the 1992 Summer Olympics
Sportspeople from Pärnu